Azerbaijani is the only official language in Azerbaijan and is spoken by the majority of its population, however, a number of minority languages also exist in the country. The largest minority languages are Lezgian, Talysh, Avar, Russian and Tat. There are also other languages which are spoken by a very small percentage of the population such as Tsakhur and Khinalug.

General 

The primary and official language of Azerbaijan is Azerbaijani, a Turkic language closely related to and partially mutually intelligible  with Modern Turkish.  Together with Turkish, Turkmen and Gagauz, Azerbaijani is a member of Oghuz branch of southwestern group Turkic language family.

Present 
According to the 2009 census of the country, Azerbaijani is spoken as a native language by 92.5% of the population, whereas Russian and English play significant roles as languages of education and communication. More than half of Azerbaijani speakers are monolingual. The large Armenian-speaking population of Nagorno-Karabakh is no longer under government control. Lezgian, Talysh, Avar, Georgian, Budukh, Juhuri, Khinalug, Kryts, Jek, Rutul, Tsakhur, Tat, and Udi are all spoken by minorities.
All these (with the exception of Armenian, Lezgian, Talysh, Avar, and Georgian, which have a much larger number of speakers outside Azerbaijan, but nevertheless are steadily declining within Azerbaijan) above-mentioned languages are endangered languages which are threatened with extinction, as they are spoken by few (less than 10,000) or very few (less than 1,000) people and their usage is steadily declining with emigration and modernization.

According to 2019 research, English language proficiency in Azerbaijan was the lowest among surveyed European countries.

An entire issue of the International Journal of the Sociology of Language, edited by Jala Garibova, was devoted to the matter of languages and language choices in Azerbaijan, vol. 198 in 2009.

Azerbaijan has not ratified the European Charter for Regional or Minority Languages to which it became a signatory in 1992, under the Popular Front. In 2001, the then President of Azerbaijan Heydar Aliyev issued a statement whereby "the Republic of Azerbaijan is not in the power to guarantee the implementation of the Charter regulations until its territory occupied by the Republic of Armenia is liberated".

History

See also
 Ancient Azari language
 History of Azerbaijan

References

External links
Ethnologue page on Azerbaijan
Language situation in Azerbaijan 
Azerbaijani Language

Further reading 
 Azerbaijani manual